Martadoris is a genus of colorful sea slugs, dorid nudibranchs, shell-less marine gastropod mollusks in the family Polyceridae.

Species 
Species in the genus Martadoris include:
 Martadoris amakusana (Baba, 1987)
 Martadoris divae (Er. Marcus, 1958)
 Martadoris limaciformis (Eliot, 1908)
 Martadoris mediterranea (Domínguez, Pola & Ramón, 2015)
 Martadoris oliva (K. B. Meyer, 1977)

References

Polyceridae